The Breeders' Cup Juvenile is a Thoroughbred horse race for 2-year-old colts and geldings raced on dirt. It is held annually in late October or early November at a different racetrack in the United States or Canada as part of the Breeders' Cup World Championships. The current purse is 	US$2,000,000 making it the most valuable race for two-year-olds in North America. It is normally run at a distance of  miles.

The Breeders' Cup Juvenile is typically the first time that the best colts from the various racing circuits across North America (in New York, Kentucky and California in particular) meet up with each other. The winner often earns the Eclipse Award for Champion Two-Year-Old Male Horse, and becomes one of the early favorites for the next year's Kentucky Derby.

In 2006, the National Thoroughbred Racing Association (NTRA) wrote in Part 2 of their special series titled Spiraling To The Breeders' Cup that "Arazi turned in what many still consider to be the single-most spectacular performance in Breeders' Cup history."

Timber Country was the first Breeders' Cup Juvenile winner to win an American Triple Crown race when he went on to win the 1995 Preakness Stakes. The 2006 winner, Street Sense, became the first to capture the Kentucky Derby. In 2016, Nyquist won the Kentucky Derby as well.

Automatic Berths 
Beginning in 2007, the Breeders' Cup developed the Breeders' Cup Challenge, a series of "Win and You're In" races that allot automatic qualifying bids to winners of defined races. Each of the fourteen divisions has multiple qualifying races, which change somewhat from year to year. Note that one horse may win multiple challenge races, while other challenge winners will not be entered in the Breeders' Cup for a variety of reasons such as injury or travel considerations.

In the Juvenile division, the number of runners is limited to 14. The 2022 "Win and You're In" races were:
 the American Pharoah Stakes, a Grade 1 race run in October at Santa Anita Park in California 
 the Champagne Stakes, a Grade 1 race run in October at Aqueduct Racetrack in New York
 the Breeders' Futurity, a Grade 1 race at Keeneland in Kentucky

Records

Most wins by a jockey:
 3 – Laffit Pincay Jr. (1985, 1986, 1988)
 3 – Jerry Bailey (1996, 1998, 2000)
 3 – Mike E. Smith (1995, 2002, 2021)

Most wins by a trainer:
 5 – D. Wayne Lukas (1986, 1987, 1988, 1994, 1996)
 5 – Bob Baffert (2002, 2008, 2013, 2018, 2021)

Most wins by an owner:
 2 – Eugene V. Klein (1987, 1988)
 2 – Overbrook Farm (with partners in 1994, 1996)
 2 – Michael Tabor & Susan Magnier (2001, with partners in 2012)
 2 – Gary & Mary West (2013, 2018)
 2 – Godolphin (2009, 2020)

Winners of the Breeders' Cup Juvenile

See also
Breeders' Cup Juvenile "top three finishers" and starters
Breeders' Cup World Thoroughbred Championships
American thoroughbred racing top attended events
Road to the Kentucky Derby

References

Racing Post:
 ,

External links
Official Breeders' Cup website
Three Great Moments: Breeders' Cup Juvenile at Hello Race Fans!

Horse races in the United States
Flat horse races for two-year-olds
Juvenile
Grade 1 stakes races in the United States
Graded stakes races in the United States
Recurring sporting events established in 1984
1984 establishments in North America